2486 Metsähovi, provisional designation , is a stony asteroid and synchronous binary system from the inner regions of the asteroid belt, approximately 10 kilometers in diameter. It was discovered on 22 March 1939, by Finnish astronomer Yrjö Väisälä at the Turku Observatory.

Orbit and classification 

Metsähovi orbits the Sun at a distance of 2.1–2.4 AU once every 3 years and 5 months (1,248 days). Its orbit has an eccentricity of 0.08 and an inclination of 8° with respect to the ecliptic.

Naming 

This minor planet was named for a donated farm near Helsinki, where various institutes have established their observing stations: the Finnish Geodetic Institute for space geodesy, the University of Helsinki for astrophysics, and the Helsinki University of Technology for radio astronomy. (Also see Metsähovi Radio Observatory). The approved naming citation was published by the Minor Planet Center on 26 May 1983.

Satellite 

A moon was discovered in 2006 from lightcurve observations and announced in 2007.

References

External links 
 Asteroids with Satellites, Robert Johnston, johnstonsarchive.net
 Asteroid Lightcurve Database (LCDB), query form (info )
 Dictionary of Minor Planet Names, Google books
 Asteroids and comets rotation curves, CdR – Observatoire de Genève, Raoul Behrend
 Discovery Circumstances: Numbered Minor Planets (1)-(5000) – Minor Planet Center
 

002486
Discoveries by Yrjö Väisälä
Named minor planets
002486
19390322